Gustav Linkvist (forename spelled also as Kustav, surname as Linquist; 13 January 1884 Kolga Parish Harju County – 1936) was an Estonian lawyer and politician.

1917-1918 he was Executive of the Nutrition Department of the Päts provincial cabinet.

References

1884 births
20th-century Estonian lawyers
20th-century Estonian politicians
University of Tartu alumni
Burials at Rahumäe Cemetery
People from Kuusalu Parish
1936 deaths